Tornos cinctarius is a species of geometrid moth in the family Geometridae. It is found in North America.

The MONA or Hodges number for Tornos cinctarius is 6485.

References

Further reading

 
 

Boarmiini
Articles created by Qbugbot
Moths described in 1887